Ohlau may refer to:

Oława (German: Ohlau), a town in south-western Poland
Oława (river), a river of Poland, tributary of the Oder
Ohlau (Hudau), a river of Schleswig-Holstein, Germany, tributary of the Hudau
John George of Ohlau (Polish: Jan Jerzy oławski) (1552–1592), Duke of Ohlau and Wohlau Wołów